L′Écume des Jours or Froth on the daydream is a 1947 French novel by Boris Vian.  It may also refer to:

Literature 
 Froth on the Daydream, 1967 translation by Stanley Chapman
 Foam of the Daze, a 2003 translation by Brian Harper

Film 
 Spray of the Days, a 1968 film adaptation directed by Charles Belmont
 Mood Indigo (film), a 2013 film adaptation directed by Michel Gondry

Music 
 L'écume des jours (opera), a 1981 opera adaptation by Russian composer Edison Denisov